Jean-Paul George (born March 22, 1944) is a French Chairman and CEO of the energy sector. He is known as co-founder and Chairman of Altergaz, the first French independent natural gas company, created in 2003.

Early life
Jean-Paul George graduated from École Polytechnique (1964) and CentraleSupélec (1967-69).

Career
Jean-Paul George entered in EDF-GDF group in the 70's, he was sales manager of Gaz de France and he is known as founder of the first Gaz de France's subsidiary: Cofathec, today renamed ENGIE Cofely (€2,2bn of turnover in 2018). He was CEO of Cofathec group from 1994 to 2000 before being appointed Delegate-General of Gaz de France's e-company.

Altergaz
After retirement, he cofounded in 2003 with Robert Delbos (former Treasurer, CFO of EDF-GDF and CEO of Solfea bank) and the investor Georges Cohen (founder of Transiciel) the first French independent natural gas company : Altergaz (turnover in 2012 : €1,6 billion). Delbos was the CEO and George the Chairman of Altergaz between 2003 and 2012.

After years of collaboration, Eni, the Italian multinational Oil & Gas company, acquired Altergaz, that was renamed Eni Gas & Power France with 1,5 million of customers in France.

Honours
George has been decorated with the National Order of the Legion of Honour.

References

1943 births
Living people
HEC Paris alumni
French businesspeople
École Polytechnique alumni